Acquired progressive lymphangioma is a group of lymphangiomas that occur anywhere in young individuals, grow slowly, and present as bruise-like lesions or erythematous macules.

See also 
 List of cutaneous conditions

References

External links 

Dermal and subcutaneous growths